Overthrow of Viktor Yanukovych may refer to:
 2014 Ukrainian revolution, where president Viktor Yanukovych was ousted
 Orange Revolution of 2004–2005, where president-elect Viktor Yanukovych's electoral victory was nullified

See also
 Viktor Yanukovych
 Politics of Ukraine